Peter Lewison (born December 7, 1961) is an American fencer. He competed in the individual and team foil events at the 1984 and 1988 Summer Olympics.

References

External links
 

1961 births
Living people
American male foil fencers
Olympic fencers of the United States
Fencers at the 1984 Summer Olympics
Fencers at the 1988 Summer Olympics
Sportspeople from Port of Spain
Pan American Games medalists in fencing
Pan American Games bronze medalists for the United States
Fencers at the 1987 Pan American Games